Anna Hagemann (26 February 1919 – 2 October 2008) was a German athlete. She competed in the women's discus throw at the 1936 Summer Olympics.

References

1919 births
2008 deaths
Athletes (track and field) at the 1936 Summer Olympics
German female discus throwers
Olympic athletes of Germany
Place of birth missing